Briana Nicole Henry (born January 19, 1992) is an American actress and is recognized for her portrayal of Jordan Ashford on ABC's General Hospital and Esmeralda on The Young and the Restless.

Early life 
Henry was born in Broward County, Florida, on January 19, 1992, to a cop and a jazz singer.

Personal life 
Henry married musician Kris Bowers on June 6, 2020, in Los Angeles. In November 2021, she announced she was pregnant with her first child. She gave birth to a daughter on February 28, 2022.

Filmography

References

External links 

 
 
 

1992 births
Living people
American soap opera actresses
21st-century American actresses